Paterika Vaivai (born 14 February 1992) is a Samoan professional rugby union footballer who plays for SU Agen Lot-et-Garonne in the Top 14.

He previously played for the Newcastle Knights and Gold Coast Titans in the National Rugby League, and the Leigh Centurions in the Championship.

Background
Vaivai was born in Salamumu, Samoa, and moved to New Zealand at a young age. 

He played his junior rugby league for the Bay Roskill Vikings in the Auckland Rugby League's Sharman Cup, before being signed by the Melbourne Storm.

Playing career

Early career
After playing with the Melbourne Storm, Vaivai returned to New Zealand in 2010 to play for the New Zealand Warriors. He was a part of their NYC squad but didn't play a game. In 2012, he joined the Newcastle Knights. He played for the Knights' NYC team in 2012, winning the Knights' NYC Coach's Award, before graduating to the Knights' New South Wales Cup team in 2013.

2014
In round 9 of the 2014 NRL season, Vaivai made his NRL debut for the Knights against the Penrith Panthers. On 1 November, he re-signed with the Knights on a 2-year contract.

2015
Vaivai went on to play 5 more games in 2015, but at the end of the season, was released a year early from his Knights contract, due to being arrested for allegedly taking part in what was reported as an out-of-control brawl.

2016
In 2016, Vaivai joined the Burleigh Bears in the Queensland Cup. In September, after impressing in the Queensland Cup, he signed a 1-year contract with the Gold Coast Titans starting in 2017.

2017
Vaivai played 10 NRL games for the Titans in the 2017 season. In October, he signed a 2-year contract with the Leigh Centurions in the Kingstone Press Championship, starting in 2018.

2021
On 15 Feb 2021 it was reported that he had agreed to leave Toulouse Olympique by mutual consent with immediate effect

On 15 April 2021 it was announced that he had switched code to play for French rugby union club SU Agen in the Top 14

References

External links

Leigh Centurions profile
Gold Coast Titans profile

1992 births
Living people
Bay Roskill Vikings players
Burleigh Bears players
Gold Coast Titans players
Leigh Leopards players
Newcastle Knights players
People from Gaga'emauga
Rugby league props
Samoan emigrants to New Zealand
Samoan rugby league players
SU Agen Lot-et-Garonne players
Toulouse Olympique players